Step off may refer to:
Step-off, a parameter in estimating the severity of injury of the posterior cruciate ligament
Step Off (album)
Step Off, 1984 Melle Mel song